Dear Friend: Kay Tagal Kitang Hinintay is a 2009 Philippine television drama series broadcast by GMA Network. It is the sixth instalment of Dear Friend.

Plot
After five years of running away from home due to a failed love life, Rachel (Sunshine Dizon) is back to start a new leaf on her life and career. Beautiful and successful, Rachel is staying at the top of her game as a famous and in demand wedding coordinator.

She perfectly knows what to do to make any wedding a fabulous and splendid event until she meets Dianne (Chynna Ortaleza), an ecstatic bride who picks Rachel as the wedding coordinator for her wedding.

Rachel's life is turned upside down when she discovers that Michael (Polo Ravales), her ex-boyfriend and former groom to be who didn't show up on their wedding day, is engaged to her client, Dianne.

How will Rachel confront her past and face the man who made her life miserable? Will there be a second chance for the former lovers to reunite?.

Cast and characters
Main cast
Sunshine Dizon as Rachel
Polo Ravales as Michael
Chynna Ortaleza as Dianne

Supporting cast
Rochelle Barrameda as tita Verna
Mel Martinez as Samsara
Princess Violago as Anne
Dinky Doo as Nestor

References

2009 Philippine television series debuts
2009 Philippine television series endings
Filipino-language television shows
GMA Network drama series
Television shows set in the Philippines